Maria Lampadaridou Pothou (born October 15, 1933) is a Greek novelist, poet and playwright. She has received awards and recognition from the Academy of Athens and other literary societies.

Biography

Early years
She was born in Myrina, Lemnos. From an early age, she developed an interest in literature. When she finished her elementary studies in Lemnos, she was appointed as a clerk to the Provincial court of the island by written exams. 1959 she published her first poetry collection, Encounters. Odysseus Elytis sent her a letter with his own positive review of the book, calling her a “fellow poet”.  While she worked, she took exams at the Panteion University of Social and Political Sciences in order to complete a degree by distance learning. In 1963 she received her degree and settled in Athens permanently. Two years later she was granted a fellowship from the French Government to study Theatre at the Sorbonne University, Paris.

Paris
In September 1966, she traveled to Paris and settled at a student residence in the Quartier Latin. While she was there, she was introduced to the modern movements of Western philosophy, such as nihilism and the Theatre of the Absurd, as well as writers of existential agony, such as Albert Camus, Kafka, Samuel Beckett. The work of Beckett, especially, had a profound effect on her. His 1967 play "Oh les beaux jours" staged at Odeon Theatre in Paris deeply influenced her to ask him permission to translate it into Greek. From then on they started a long lasting correspondence. She became a translator of his works but she also wrote an essay book titled “Samuel Beckett, The experience of the existential grief” which was published on 1983 with an important preface by Jacque Lacarrière with good reviews and republished updated on 2016 by Enastron Publishers. Having received a scholarship at Sorbonne she attends Theatre lessons, it was then that she wrote her first absurd theatre play. Her poetic surrealistic play “Glass Box” translated in French by Ann Creushez, along with two other of her plays “Small Cage” and “The Rafts”, were pre-approved by Odeon Theatre. Unfortunately, they were never staged because of the incidents of May 1969, in Paris. In June 1967 she received her diploma for Theatrical Studies and returned to Greece. Later, her theatrical play The Glass Box impressed Samuel Beckett who send to his director Jean Lui Barreau.

Years of dictatorship, the 70s
She was living still in Paris, when a military regime was established in Greece. It was then that she wrote her theatrical play Antigone - Or the nostalgia of tragedy. This play was particularly loved by the distinguished theatrologist Bernard Dort, who happened to be her professor at Sorbonne. In 1996 this play, translated in English by Minoas Pothos and Rhoda Kaufman, was staged in California State university, Hayward, in parallel with the literary event of the Greek Culture week. Rhoda Kaufman also edited a collection of the writer's plays and poetry published under the name "A woman of Lemnos" by guernica publications. Minoas Pothos with Theony Condos also translated her novel Natalia and Christina published by Lume Books in 2016.

When she returned to Greece in 1967, life was hard for her, as she was attending the demonstrations organised in support of Greece by the French philhellene Jacques Lacarrière. She did not hesitate to propose her work The Dance of Electra, a recently written allegorical depiction of the Greek junta, to the National Theatre. This work was at first rejected as “dangerous” but was finally staged at the New Stage of The National Theatre after a lot of effort, with police custody.  The play's music was composed by Stavros Xarhakos and the scenography was made by Dionysis Photopoulos.

In 1972, Maria was married to Minoas Pothos and they had a son, Emmanuel in 1973.

In 1973, she submitted her resignation to the Ministry and focused on her writing career. In 1987 she was awarded by the Academy of Athens for her historical novel Maroula of Lemnos. In 1989 she published one of her most important collections of poetry, Mystic Passage. The book was translated into French and prefaced by Jacque Lacarrière and published in France by Le Temps qu'il Fait in 1995. Later, it was translated into Swedish, prefaced by Ingemar Rhedin and published by Bonniers in 1996 with good reviews. In 2002, the Mystic Passage was translated into English by Theony Condos with a preface by Apostolos Athanassakis and published in the New York university magazine, The Charioteer.

Later years
In 1973, she submitted her resignation to the Ministry in order to focus on her family and books. In 1976 she experienced the loss of her second child. Since then all her work has entered a metaphysical dimension and as quoted by her "she constantly searches for the truth and knowledge beyond conventional reality in order to achieve transcendence and discover the internal light".

In 1982, when ERT president was Iakovos Kampanellis her collection of texts Letter to My Son and a Star was broadcast by NRT-1 and later on was published as a book. Letter to My Son and a Star was loved by the public both as a radio show and as a book.

In 1995, she was awarded again by the Academy of Athens for her novel With the Storm Lamp. This novel provided her with a different experience. Due to the fact that her hero had experienced time in prison, the writer had sent 200 copies to Korydallos prison, for the convicts. This move was so well received by prisoners that they invited her to give a lecture, an invitation that she gratefully accepted.

In October 2017, the Municipality of Lemnos donated her a hall named "Maria Lampadaridou Pothou" at a recently renovated mansion, to house her precious things of her work (awards, medals, letters of Elytis and Beckett, doctoral dissertations). She was also awarded the honorary medal of the Island of Lemnos by mayor Dimitrios Marinakis.

In 2019, Maria's theatrical play titled Hector, Beloved by the Gods was staged at the Ancient theatre of Hephestia in Lemnos at the end of the international archeological conference on 15 September. The performance was realised by the theatrical group of MEAS LEMNOS with the support of the Ephorate of Antiquities of Lesvos. It was her first play to be staged at the renovated Ancient theatre of Hephestia.

On July 17, 2020, her historical novel The Wooden Wall was selected by the Permanent Representation of Greece to the EU for their  “Readers of Europe reading list” initiative of the Council of the European Union. In the official post, among other things, it was written "The Wooden Wall offers inspiration in these trying times and reminds us of the timeless value of democratic principles."

Over her career, she has written more than 20 novels and published poetry and theatrical plays. She has also published numerous articles, critical reviews, and essays, in literary journals and daily newspapers, “To Vima”, “Kathimerini”, “Eleftherotypia” for many years. She has participated in many international conferences in Greece and abroad as in 1988 in Buffalo NY, 1st International Women Playwrights conference, where the writer in a general session had made an intervention "I hear about the problems of each speaker, problems of their country or of their personal life, or social or sexual or color problems, and I understand that the problem describes the difficulty of being a playwright. I don’t hear about women’s dramatic creativity as an existential necessity. I don’t hear about the stuff of her plays, the stuff of her dreams, of her internal need to be a playwright in this troubled world."  She has also participated in many literary events like in Berkeley. She is a member of the Hellenic Authors Society, the Association of Greek Playwrights, and the International Institute of the Theatre.

Her theatrical plays that have been staged in Greece and abroad include A game with time, I am a weeping star, The rafts, The Glass Box.. The latter was also taught in Sorbonne by professor Charles Antonetti and was published in the magazine education et theatre.

Selected works

Performed plays
Antigone or the Nostalgia of Tragedy
 1971-1972 Staged in Flamand Belgium, Malpertuis Theatre directed by Berten De Bells
1978 Performed on State Radio in Athens.
 1996 Staged in California State University, Directed by Edgardo de la Cruz

Electra' s Dance
 1971 Staged in National Theater of Greece directed by Lambros Kostopoulos, music by Stavros Xarchakos and stage design of Dionysis Photopoulos

Paper Moon
 1978 Performed on Greek State Television

Bidding you Farewell 
 1986-1987 Staged in G. Zeriggas Theatre
 1991 It was produced during the Second International Women Playwrights Conference, Toronto

The Glass Box
 1971 Staged in National Theater of Greece.
 1988 Staged during the First International Women Playwrights Conference, Buffalo New York
 1990 At the National television Chanel in Athens.

Hector, beloved by the gods
 2019 Staged at the Ancient theatre of Hephestia in Lemnos, during the International Conference "the Sanctuaries and Cults in the Aegean.

Book publications in other countries
 
 
 
 
 Natalia and Christina, Endeavour Press, 2001

Articles
 George Steiner, "Antigones, How the Antigone Legend Has Endured in Western Literature, Art, and Thought"
Five Great Odes by Paul Claudel
The labor of a great thinker, review on the works of Malevitsis
Lost innocence in indecent times
"Motivational passions" a review of the book Days Of Anger by Sylvie Germain
The evergreen tree, lectures and articles about Greek culture, by George Thomson
The being and the world - The lesser known side of Iris Murdoch through her philosophical thinking
"Thucydides and Athenian Imperialism" by Jacqueline De Romilly
and many others

Awards
 1966. The “Group of Twelve”  for her literary work
 1987. Academy of Athens, for the novel Maroula of Lemnos 
 1995. The Ourani's Foundation of the Academy of Athens for the novel With the Storm Lamp. 
 2001. State theater prize for the theatrical play Floating Night.
 2014. Α prize of the Greek IBBY section for the young people novel Interview with the swamp ghost.
 2017. The Municipality of Lemnos honorary medal award.

Further reading
 Preface of the poetry collection "Mystic Passage" for the French edition published by Le Temps qu’ il faît, 1995 by Jacques Lacarrière
Foreword to the poetry collection "Secret Passage" in the Swedish edition of the book, Stockholm, Bonniers Publications, 1996 by Ingemar Rhedin
Reading Mystic Passage review by Apostolos Athanasakis
Mystic Passage, critique of the author Christos Malevitsis
Mystic Passage, “You have to make life difficult”, review by Bengt Holmqvist
The Angel of Ashes, review by Eri Stavropoulou, “The fragile balance in the Angel of Ashes”
The Wooden Wall, review by Zoe Samara
Moonlight, review by Maria Litsardaki, “A fight of uneven confrontation with seen and unseen forces”
Paths of my angel. review by Anda Gkivalou, "On the paths of the life and works of Maria Lampadaridou Pothou"
Samuel Beckett - The experience of existential grief, review by Takis Mendrakos
and many others

Interviews
 Interview in ΒΗΜΑgazino with Eri Vardaki, The Wooden Wall in the European Union
Interview to professor Dimitra Chalazia, for the magazine “Knowledge travels.. in Greek” published in Switzerland
"I made this, I forgot and remember", interview to Eleni Gika for fractalart.gr
Interview to Katerina Lymperopoulou for Huffpost Greece
Interview in Liberal.gr
The droplet and the river, interview with Zoe Samara for the Review Themata Logotechnias
and many others

Speeches
 Opening speech for the 2nd International Women Playwrights Conference held in Toronto, Canada 1991.
Speech for the International Woman's Playwright Conference, in Athens
The city has been taken, special event in 14 Thessaloniki Book Fair
Salamis, the island that gave birth to History, speech about the Wooden Wall in Salamis
"Antigone - or Nostalgia of tragedy", the modern sense of Tragic speech at the XII INTERNATIONAL MEETING ON ANCIENT GREEK DRAMA SOPHOCLES 2,500 YEARS SINCE HIS BIRTH
and many others

References

External links 

National Book Centre of Greece
Author's website
Interview at Ianos bookstore 2017
Interview at pemptousia.com
Interviews in Third Programme Radio of the ERT
Maria Lampadaridou Pothou in ertwebradio
A Civil Servant, broadcast by the HBC production "The theatre of Monday" in 1983
Paper Moon, Part 1 & Part 2, broadcast by the HBC production "The theatre of Monday" in 1978

Living people
1933 births
Greek novelists